The Barcelona Trail Races or BTR (also known as Ultratrail Collserola during its first editions) is a running event that includes several mountain races or trail running races. It takes place once a year in the Collserola Park in Barcelona, Catalonia, Spain. The first edition was in 2013.

In 2017, a relay category was included for the first time in teams of two runners with only one fixed relay point. In 2018, the relay modality changed and became more flexible. The teams were of minimum two and maximum five runners and the relay place could be decided by the team but had to be in one of the refreshment posts. 

In 2020 the race was canceled due to COVID-19 restrictions.

Editions

Route 

The route of the Barcelona Trail Races is not characterised by large elevation gains, very steep slopes or technical difficulties. It is "a mountain race that has more long distances than impossible slopes and in which all the secrets that Collserola hides are revealed". The hardness of the race is due to the softness of the ascents and descents that push the runners to a non-stop pace making it very fast: "here you come to run and not have a second to rest. A leg-breaker route". Note that the pace of the winners in the long race is between 5 and 6 min/km.

The fact that the race starts in the city of Barcelona, ″it's only a few stops on the metro from the centre of Barcelona″, and the characteristics of the route, make it a perfect option for those who want to run their first ultra mountain race: ″Thinking about where to do your first trail marathon? Go to Barcelona. If you are looking for a race where city meets trail, this is it″.

Winners

Female winners

Male winners

Pictures

Links 

 Official web page www.bcntrailraces.com

References 

Trail running competitions
Sport in Barcelona
Ultramarathons
Athletics competitions in Spain